The Good Bandit (Spanish: Un bandido honrado), is a Colombian comedy telenovela created by Juan Manuel Cáceres, and is recorded in 4K Ultra-high-definition television. The series premiered on 10 June 2019 on Caracol Televisión, and concluded on 9 September 2019. The series stars Diego Vásquez as the titular character, along Carolina Acevedo, and Norma Nivia as the main antagonist.

The first episode of the series premiered with a total of 12.3 million viewers, becoming the most watched show that day and surpassing its competition Yo soy Betty, la fea, and occupying the first place as the most watched program nationwide. During its first month on the air, the series managed to position itself as the most watched in Colombia. Despite having been one of the most watched programs obtaining first place, the last episode of the series aired on 9 September 2019 obtained a total of 10.4 million viewers, occupying the third place as the most watched program nationwide.

The series is available via streaming on Netflix since 31 August 2019, only 63 episodes are shown on Netflix, unlike its original broadcast.

Cast

Main 
 Diego Vásquez as Emilio de Jesús "El Crespo" Ortega Rangel
 Carolina Acevedo as Milena Aponte de Ortega
 Ana María Arango as Doña Raquel Rangel de Ortega
 Álvaro Bayona as Horacio Muñoz
 Katherine Porto as Jopini
 Tiberio Cruz as Daniel Alberto Rodríguez "Pichuchas"
 Norma Nivia as Natalia Peralta
 Juan Manuel Restrepo as Tuto
 Felipe Calero as Andrés Morales
 Jimena Durán as Detective Consuelo Martínez
 Andrés Toro as Detective Jairo Ramírez
 Sebastián Sánchez as Dylan Julián Ortega Aponte
 Isabella Barragán as Mati Ortega Aponte

Recurring 
 Julio Pachón as San Judas Tadeo
 Paola Jara as Pamela Ramírez
 Freddy Ordóñez as Detective Perea
 Juan Carlos Solarte as Coronel Daza
 Jorge Herrera as Diego Raigoso
 Astrid Junguito as María del Pilar
 Alejandro Gutiérrez as Mauro
 Roger Moreno as Cara e' puño
 María Camila Rueda as Daniela "Dani"
 Marcela Forero as Yesi
 Juan Carlos Arango as Don Fercho
 Erick Rodríguez as Lalo
 Liliana González as Francy

References

External links 

 

2019 telenovelas
2019 Colombian television series debuts
Caracol Televisión telenovelas
Colombian telenovelas
Spanish-language telenovelas
Television shows set in Bogotá
Comedy telenovelas
2019 Colombian television series endings